In the 2021–22 season, Al Sadd SC is competing in the Qatar Stars League for the 49th season, as well as the Emir of Qatar Cup and the Champions League. On November 3, after the match against Al-Duhail, Xavi left the club to be the new coach of FC Barcelona ​​six years after his departure and this is after an agreement was reached between the two clubs.

Squad list
Players and squad numbers last updated on 3 September 2021.Note: Flags indicate national team as has been defined under FIFA eligibility rules. Players may hold more than one non-FIFA nationality.

Pre-season and friendlies

Competitions

Overview

{| class="wikitable" style="text-align: center"
|-
!rowspan=2|Competition
!colspan=8|Record
!rowspan=2|Started round
!rowspan=2|Final position / round
!rowspan=2|First match	
!rowspan=2|Last match
|-
!
!
!
!
!
!
!
!
|-
| Qatar Stars League

| Matchday 1
| style="background:gold;"|Winner
| 12 September 2021
| 11 March 2022
|-
| 2021 Emir of Qatar Cup

| Final
| style="background:gold;"| Winners
| colspan=2| 22 October 2021
|-
| 2022 Emir of Qatar Cup

| Round of 16
| Semi-finals
| 13 February 2022
| 14 March 2022
|-
| 2022 Champions League

| colspan=2| Group stage
| 8 April 2022
| 27 April 2022
|-
! Total

Qatar Stars League

League table

Results summary

Results by round

Matches

2021 Emir of Qatar Cup

2022 Emir of Qatar Cup

2022 AFC Champions League

Group stage

On 16 February 2022, AFC confirmed hosts for the East group stage. On 3 March 2022, AFC confirmed hosts for the West group stage.
Group E: Dammam, Saudi Arabia

Group E

Squad information

Playing statistics

|-
! colspan=16 style=background:#dcdcdc; text-align:center| Players transferred out during the season

Goalscorers

Includes all competitive matches. The list is sorted alphabetically by surname when total goals are equal.

Assists

Transfers

In

Out

New contracts

Notes

References

Al Sadd SC seasons
Qatari football clubs 2021–22 season